Mario Checcacci (29 April 1909 – 4 January 1990) was an Italian rower who competed in the 1936 Summer Olympics. He was born in Livorno in 1909. In 1936 he won the silver medal as crew member of the Italian boat in the Olympic men's eight event.

References

External links
 
 Obituary for Oreste Grossi, the last surviving member of the silver medal-winning Men's eights team at the 1936 Summer Olympics 

1909 births
1990 deaths
Italian male rowers
Olympic rowers of Italy
Rowers at the 1936 Summer Olympics
Olympic silver medalists for Italy
Sportspeople from Livorno
Olympic medalists in rowing
Medalists at the 1936 Summer Olympics
European Rowing Championships medalists